"Valerie" is a 1982 song written by English musician and songwriter Steve Winwood and Will Jennings, and originally recorded by Winwood for his third solo album, Talking Back to the Night (1982).

Background
The song deals with a man reminiscing about a lost love he hopes to find again someday. Will Jennings reportedly wrote the lyrics while thinking about singer Valerie Carter, whose career was declining, in part, because of drug use. On its original release, the single reached number 51 on the UK Singles Chart and number 70 on the US Billboard Hot 100.

In 1987, a remix by Tom Lord-Alge was included as a single from Winwood's compilation album Chronicles. The remixed version of "Valerie" climbed to number 9 on the Billboard Hot 100 in late December 1987, and also reached number 19 on the UK Singles Chart. Both versions also reached number 13 on the U.S. Mainstream Rock Tracks chart.

DJ Falcon recalled in an interview that he and Thomas Bangalter, as a duo called Together, had sampled "Valerie" to create a track that they used in DJ sets. Falcon added that the duo had no intention of releasing it as a single, despite demand from various outlets.

Eric Prydz later sampled "Valerie" in 2004 for a house music track and presented it to Winwood, who was so impressed with what Prydz had done, he re-recorded the vocals to better fit the track. It was released as "Call on Me" that same year. "Call on Me" was, in turn, sampled in 2009's "Pass Out" from Chris Brown (featuring Eva Simons) on his Graffiti album, also co-produced by Prydz.

Track listing
 1982 single:
"Valerie"
"Slowdown Sundown"

 1987 7-inch single:
"Valerie"
"Talking Back to the Night" (instrumental)

 1987 12" and CD single:
"Valerie"
"Talking Back to the Night" (instrumental)
"The Finer Things" (12" version)

Charts

1982 release

1987 release

Year-end charts

References

External links
Dave Connolly discography: Steve Winwood - "Valerie"

1982 songs
1982 singles
1987 singles
Steve Winwood songs
Songs with lyrics by Will Jennings
Songs written by Steve Winwood
Island Records singles